Midway is an 'L' station on the CTA's Orange Line. It is the southwestern terminus of the Orange Line and serves Midway International Airport in Chicago, the city's second-largest airport. The turnstiles at the station's entrance are somewhat wider than most to accommodate airport passengers and their luggage. The station, along with the rest of the Orange Line, opened on October 31, 1993 after a long wait by Chicago's southwest side for 'L' access. It is also the closest station to SeatGeek Stadium, former home of the Chicago Fire, which is approximately 4 miles away. Although in the Garfield Ridge community area, the station serves many residents in the West Elsdon and West Lawn neighborhoods.

History

Prior to 1993, the southwest side was served only by the Douglas Park Branch of the West-Northwest Line. As the city expanded, this service became insufficient. As early as the 1940s, when subways were being constructed under State and Dearborn Streets, the city planned to expand the 'L' to Midway Airport. However, this plan was not approved.

On January 22, 1990, there was a groundbreaking ceremony held at the future site of Midway Station. Many people attended, including Mayor Daley; Bernard Ford, the CTA Acting Executive Director; and David Williams, the Chicago public works commissioner. In 1993, the CTA finished building the new Orange Line. It cost $500 million despite the use of abandoned railroad right-of-ways. Midway Station includes a three-track terminal, a rail yard, a car maintenance facility, an island and side platform, elevators leading to the sidewalk, and escalators and stairs connecting to the moving walkway heading to the airport.

When the garage was built on the east side of Cicero, it bisected the walkway from the station to the airport. In 2002, the Department of Aviation built a walkway through the garage.

Bus connections
CTA
47 47th
54B South Cicero
55 Garfield
55A 55th/Austin (Weekday Rush Hours only)
55N 55th/Narragansett (Monday-Saturday only)
59 59th/61st (Monday-Saturday only)
62H Archer/Harlem (Monday-Saturday only)
N62 Archer (Owl Service - Overnight only)
63 63rd (Owl Service)
63W West 63rd
165 West 65th (Weekday Rush Hours only)

Pace
379 Midway/Orland Park
383 South Cicero
384 Narragansett/Ridgeland
385 87th/111th/127th (Weekdays only)
386 South Harlem
387 SeatGeek Stadium Direct (Game Days & Events only)
390 Midway CTA/UPS Hodgkins (Weekday UPS shifts only)

River Valley Metro

 Midway Commuter Shuttle

References

References

External links
Midway International Airport Station Page at Chicago-L.org
2005 Ridership Reports

Midway Station Page
Midway Station and Bus Terminal as viewed from 59th Street on Google Maps Street View

1993 establishments in Illinois
Railway stations in the United States opened in 1993
CTA Orange Line stations
Chicago "L" terminal stations
Airport railway stations in the United States
CTA